Tokugawa coinage was a unitary and independent metallic monetary system established by shōgun Tokugawa Ieyasu in 1601 in Japan, and which lasted throughout the Tokugawa period until its end in 1867.

History

The establishment of Tokugawa coinage followed a period in which Japan was dependent on Chinese bronze coins for its currency.  Tokugawa coinage lasted for more than two centuries, and ended with the events of the Boshin war and the establishment of the Meiji restoration. However, there is an ongoing discussion of the entity of the precious metal coins. It was not a part of Tokugawa bakuhu which issued gold and silver coins, but private organizations owned by merchants.

The first attempt at a new currency were made by Hideyoshi, who developed the large Ōban plate, also called the Tensho Ōban (天正大判), in 1588.

From 1601, Tokugawa coinage was minted in gold, silver, and bronze denominations.  The denominations were fixed, but the rates actually fluctuated on the exchange market.

The material for the coinage came from gold and silver mines across Japan. To this effect, gold mines were newly opened and exploited, such as the Sado gold mine or the Toi gold mine in Izu Peninsula.

Devaluations and re-evaluations
Initially, the coinage was used essentially for export purposes in order to pay for imports of luxury goods from China, such as silk. As gold and silver were in short supply, and also because the government was running a deficit, the content of gold in coins was decreased on two occasions, in 1695 and 1706–11, in order to generate more revenues from seigneurage, but with the effect of generating inflation.

With the beginning of the 18th century, Japan started to restrict the export of bullion currency, which came to be seen as a loss for the country. An export ban on monetary specie was imposed by Arai Hakuseki in 1715. Trade substitution was encouraged, but remained limited anyway due to the policy of closure, or Sakoku. Upon Arai Hakuseki's suggestion the government increased again the gold and silver content of coinage in 1714-1715, but this led to crippling deflation this time. In 1736, Japan abandoned this policy and again increased the money supply, with a resulting price stability for the next 80 years.

In the early 19th century, budgetary problems resulting from natural disasters and large Tokugawa governmental expenditures led the government to increase the money supply and the seigneurage associated to it. From 1818 to 1829 the money supply increased by 60%, and from 1832 to 1837 by 20%. Severe inflation again followed as prices nearly doubled.

Structure

Tokugawa coinage worked according to a triple monetary standard, using gold, silver and bronze coins, each with their own denominations. The systems worked by multiples of 4, and coins were valued according to the Ryō. One Ryō was worth 4 Bu, 16 Shu, or 4,000 Mon (a cheap bronze coin).

Ōban
The Ōban (大判) was a very large gold coin plate, equivalent to ten Ryōs, or ten Koban (小判) plates.

Koban

The Koban (小判) was a regular ovoid gold coin, equivalent to one Ryō. The initial Keichō Koban (minted from 1601) had a weight of 18.20g. The 1714 Sado Koban (佐渡小判金, 4th year of Shōtoku) also had a weight of 18.20g and was made with an alloy of typically 85.69% of gold and 14.25% of silver.

Nibuban and Ichibuban

The Nibuban (二分判) was worth half a Koban and was rectangular gold coin.

The Ichibuban (一分判) could be either made of silver or gold, in which case it was a quarter of a Koban. The gold Ichibuban of 1714 (佐渡一分判金) had a weight of 4.5 g, with 85.6% of gold and 14.2% of silver. The silver Ichibuban from 1837 to 1854 (Tenpō Ichibugin, 天保一分銀, "Old Ichibuban") weighed 8.66 g, with an alloy of 0.21% gold and 98.86% silver.

Nishuban and Isshuban
There were then Nishuban (二朱判) and Isshuban (一朱判) small denominations of silver or gold, before getting to the Mon or Sen bronze coins.

From 1853 to 1865, the silver Isshuban (Kaei Isshugin, 嘉永一朱銀) weighed 1.88 g, with an alloy of 1.7% gold, 98.7% silver and 1.12% copper.

Kan'ei Tsūhō 

Regarding copper coins, the Kan'ei Tsūhō coin (Kyūjitai: 寛永通寶 ; Shinjitai: 寛永通宝) came to replace the Chinese coins that had been in circulation in Japan, as well as those that were minted privately, and became the legal tender. This put an end to more than four centuries during which Chinese copper coins, obtained through trade or Wakō piracy, had been the main currency of Japan.

Tenpō Tsūhō 
 

In 1835 the Tokugawa government started minting copper 100 mon named Tenpō Tsūhō (Kyūjitai: 天保通寶 ; Shinjitai: 天保通宝) as a way to solve its budgetary deficit, as the coin contained only 5½ as much copper as a 1 mon Kan'ei tsūhō this eventually lead to inflation. This was later followed by the Satsuma Domain issuing a 100 mon coin of their own in 1862 to supposedly produce currency for the Ryukyu Kingdom, while in reality doing it to boost their own economy. These Ryūkyū Tsūhō (琉球通寳) coins eventually started circulating in other provinces as well.

Demise

From 1772, the silver coins had a denomination in function of their value in gold, and had significantly less silver than their face value (rather than being just silver-by-weight) so as to cover coinage expenses, a practice known as token or fiduciary coinage, and a characteristic of modern coinage. This technique was introduced later in England, in 1816, with its adoption of the full gold standard. At the market rates of 1858 10 silver units could be exchanged for 1 gold unit by weight, whereas the face value of silver units was only convertible at 5 to 1. This permitted an increase of monetary circulation without actual production of more bullion, and provided great profit (seigniorage) for the Bakufu.

World ratios for silver and gold were significantly different, gold being generally valued much higher than silver, at about 15 to 16 weights of silver for 1 weight of gold. This difference motivated foreigners to bring silver to Japan, to exchange it for gold at a very profitable rate.

In 1858, Western countries, especially the United States, France and Great Britain imposed through "unequal treaties" (Treaty of Amity and Commerce") free trade, free monetary flow, and very low tariffs, effectively taking away Japanese control of its foreign exchange: The 1715 export embargo on bullion was thus lifted:

This created a massive outflow of gold from Japan, as foreigners rushed to exchange their silver for "token" silver Japanese coinage and again exchange these against gold, giving a 200% profit to the transaction. In 1860, about 4 million ryōs thus left Japan, that is about 70 tons of gold. This effectively destroyed Japan's gold standard system, and forced it to return to weight-based system with international rates. The Bakufu instead responded to the crises by debasing the gold content of its coins by two thirds, so as to match foreign gold-silver exchange ratios.

As a consequence, the Bakufu lost the major profit source of recoinage (seigniorage), and was forced to issue unbacked paper money, leading to major inflation. This was one of the major causes of discontent during the Bakumatsu period, and one of the causes of the demise of the shogunate.

Other coins
Despite Tokugawa Ieyasu's strong will to unify the currency, there were still some local exceptions, with locally made currency.

Notes

Bibliography

Economic history of Japan
Edo period
Modern obsolete currencies

de:Japanische Währungsgeschichte#Edo-Zeit